is a 1953 black-and-white Japanese romance film, the first  film directed by the actress Kinuyo Tanaka, who was the second woman to have a career as a film director in Japan. It was entered into the 1954 Cannes Film Festival.

Cast
 Masayuki Mori as Reikichi Mayumi
 Juzo Dosan as Hiroshi (Reikichi's brother)
 Yoshiko Kuga as Michiko Kubota
 Jūkichi Uno as Naoto Yamaji
 Kyōko Kagawa as Yasuko
 Shizue Natsukawa as Reikichi's mother
 Kinuyo Tanaka as landlady
 Chieko Seki as office lady
 Ranko Hanai as restaurant owner
 Chieko Nakakita as woman at restaurant

References

External links

1953 films
1950s romance films
Japanese black-and-white films
Films directed by Kinuyo Tanaka
1950s Japanese-language films
Japanese romance films
1950s Japanese films